Song Ho-Young  (born 21 January 1988) is a South Korean football forward, who plays for Bucheon FC 1995 in K League Challenge.

Club career

Gyeonam FC 
In 2009, he was drafted to Gyeongnam FC. On 8 March 2009, he made his first K-League appearance in the 1:1 drawn against Jeonbuk Hyundai Motors at the Changwon Civil Stadium. On 10 May 2009, he scored his first goal, the winning goal of the match in a 1:0 defeat against Gangwon FC and scored his 2nd goal in the 4:1 victory against Chunnam Dragons on 6 September.  On 25 October 2009, Song scored a brace for Gyeonam during a 4:1 win against Seongnam Ilhwa Chunma at the Changwon Civil Stadium.

Honors

Club
Seongnam Ilhwa Chunma
2010 AFC Champions League Winner
2011 FA Cup Winner

References

External links 

1988 births
Living people
Association football midfielders
South Korean footballers
Gyeongnam FC players
Seongnam FC players
Jeju United FC players
Jeonnam Dragons players
Bucheon FC 1995 players
K League 1 players
K League 2 players
People from Hwaseong, Gyeonggi
Sportspeople from Gyeonggi Province